Sergio Rigoni  (born 27 April 1986) is an Italian cross-country skier who competes internationally.
 
Rigoni is an athlete of the G.S. Fiamme Oro.

Biography
He represented Italy at the 2018 Winter Olympics.

Cross-country skiing results
All results are sourced from the International Ski Federation (FIS).

Olympic Games

World Championships

World Cup

Season standings

References

External links
 

1986 births
Living people
Italian male cross-country skiers
Olympic cross-country skiers of Italy
Cross-country skiers at the 2018 Winter Olympics
People from Asiago
Cross-country skiers of Fiamme Oro
Sportspeople from the Province of Vicenza